Life of Jesus may refer to:

 Life of Jesus in the New Testament
 Historical Jesus
 Chronology of Jesus
 Life of Christ in art

Books 
 Life of Jesus (Hegel)
 Life of Jesus (Strauss)

Filmed
 La Vie de Jésus (English: The Life of Jesus), a 1997 film
 Jesus: His Life, a 2019 drama series

See also 

 Jesus
 Gospel harmony
 Christ myth theory
 Jesus in comparative mythology
 Jesus of Nazareth (TV series)
 Life of Christ (disambiguation)